Calocephalus lacteus, commonly known as milky beauty-heads, is a species of flowering plant in the family Asteraceae. It is an ascending, spreading perennial with silver-grey leaves and cream globular-shaped flower heads.  It occurs in eastern Australia.

Description
The fruit is a cypsela with 6-11 bristles and fine hairs in the upper part. Flowering occurs mostly from November to March.

Taxonomy and naming
Calocephalus lacteus was first formally described in 1832 by Christian Friedrich Lessing and the description was published in Synopsis Generum Compositarum. The specific epithet (lacteus) means "milky", referring to the white bracts.

Distribution and habitat
Milky beauty-heads grows in low-lying occasionally wet and grassy situations in New South Wales, Victoria, Tasmania and South Australia.

References

Gnaphalieae
Asterales of Australia
Flora of New South Wales
Flora of Victoria (Australia)
Flora of South Australia
Flora of Tasmania